The National Indigenous Music Awards 2010 are the 7th annual National Indigenous Music Awards. It was broadcast on ABC Local Radio NT.

The nominations were announced on 5 August 2010 and awards ceremony was held on 28 August 2010.

Music NT Manager, Mark Smith said "These awards are an important platform to increase understanding and awareness of contemporary and traditional Aboriginal music and culture. There is benefit for all Territorians as we strive to achieve economic independence for musicians as well as flow-on tourism in a region of Australia which has the highest population percentage of practitioners and music production in the country".

Performers
 Warren H. Williams 
 The Tableland Drifters 
 The Saltwater Band featuring Gurrumul Yunupingu

Hall of Fame Inductee 
 Kumanjayi Murphy

Special Recognition Award
 Ali Mills - For significant contribution to the Indigenous Music Scene.

Awards
Act of the Year

Emerging Act of the Year

Album of the Year

DVD/Film Clip of the Year

Song of the Year

Artwork of the Year

Traditional Music Award

School Band of the Year

References

2010 in Australian music
2010 music awards
National Indigenous Music Awards